Tiffany Viagas (born 25 July 2002) is a Gibraltarian footballer who plays as a midfielder for Merseyrail, on loan from Liverpool Feds, and the Gibraltar women's national team.

Club career 
Coming through the youth ranks at Lincoln Red Imps, Viagas had trials with Everton, FC Twente and Liverpool before heading to Liverpool John Moores University in 2020. Returning to Gibraltar in March 2021, she briefly signed for Lynx before joining FA Women's National League side Liverpool Feds in July 2021. In February 2023, she joined Merseyrail on an agreement to the end of the season.

International career 
Viagas made her senior debut for Gibraltar on 24 June 2021 in a 1–4 friendly away loss to Liechtenstein.

Career statistics

International

References

External links 
 

Living people
2002 births
Gibraltarian women's footballers
Women's association football midfielders
Lincoln Red Imps F.C. players
Liverpool Feds W.F.C. players
Gibraltar women's international footballers
Gibraltarian expatriate footballers
Expatriate women's footballers in England
Gibraltarian expatriate sportspeople in England